Giant Panda National Park is a large protected area within the Sichuan, Gansu, and Shaanxi provinces of China. Established in 2020, the park is made up of roughly 70 nature reserves and surpasses 10,000 square miles in size, making it more than three times the size of Yellowstone National Park.

The main purpose of the park is to protect China's small giant panda population and is home to 1,864 giant pandas, 80% of the population of the species in China. This amount is most of the population of giant pandas worldwide. The park connected 67 existing reserves into one large amalgamation to better protect the pandas.

References 

 

Giant pandas
National parks of China